Daniel Teodor Bîrzu (born 28 May 2002) is a Romanian professional footballer who plays as a centre back for Liga I side Farul Constanța.

Club career

Farul Constanța
He made his league debut on 20 May 2022 in Liga I match against Universitatea Craiova.

Career statistics

Club

References

External links
 
 

2002 births
Living people
Sportspeople from Constanța
Romanian footballers
Romania youth international footballers
Association football defenders
Liga I players
FC Viitorul Constanța players
FCV Farul Constanța players